The Blackwell-Paisley Cabin is a historic summer cabin on Suits-Us Drive in Bella Vista, Arkansas.  It is a -storey wood-frame structure, facing west, with a front gable roof.  A carport is attached to the south facade of the main cabin, and projects forward of it, with its own gable roof.  The rear of the carport is screened to provide a sitting area.  Bedrooms on two levels are sheltered only by screens on three sides.  The cabin was built in 1924 by Roy Cunningham, who built many summer retreat cabins in Bella Vista.  This cabin is one of the few surviving and relatively unaltered cabins in the area from the period.

The cabin was listed on the National Register of Historic Places in 1988.

See also
National Register of Historic Places listings in Benton County, Arkansas

References

Houses on the National Register of Historic Places in Arkansas
Houses completed in 1924
Houses in Benton County, Arkansas
National Register of Historic Places in Benton County, Arkansas
Buildings and structures in Bella Vista, Arkansas
1924 establishments in Arkansas